Pitomnik is a village in the Tartar Rayon of Azerbaijan.

References
 

Populated places in Tartar District